Leet (or "1337"), also known as eleet or leetspeak, is a system of modified spellings used primarily on the Internet. It often uses character replacements  in ways that play on the similarity of their glyphs via reflection or other resemblance. Additionally, it modifies certain words based on a system of suffixes and alternate meanings. There are many dialects or linguistic varieties in different online communities.

The term "leet" is derived from the word elite, used as an adjective to describe skill or accomplishment, especially in the fields of online gaming and computer hacking. The leet lexicon includes spellings of the word as 1337 or leet.

History
Leet originated within bulletin board systems (BBS) in the 1980s, where having "elite" status on a BBS allowed a user access to file folders, games, and special chat rooms.  The Cult of the Dead Cow hacker collective has been credited with the original coining of the term, in their text-files of that era. One theory is that it was developed to defeat text filters created by BBS or Internet Relay Chat system operators for message boards to discourage the discussion of forbidden topics, like cracking and hacking. Creative misspellings and ASCII-art-derived words were also a way to attempt to indicate one was knowledgeable about the culture of computer users. 

Once reserved for hackers, crackers, and script kiddies, leet has since entered the mainstream. It is now also used to mock newbies, also known colloquially as n00bs, or newcomers, on websites, or in gaming communities. Some consider emoticons and ASCII art, like smiley faces, to be leet, while others maintain that leet consists of only symbolic word encryption. More obscure forms of leet, involving the use of symbol combinations and almost no letters or numbers, continue to be used for its original purpose of encrypted communication. It is also sometimes used as a scripting language. Variants of leet have been used for censorship purposes for many years; for instance "@$$" (ass) and "$#!+" (shit) are frequently seen to make a word appear censored to the untrained eye but obvious to a person familiar with leet. This enables coders and programmers especially to circumvent filters and speak about topics that would usually get banned. "Hacker" would end up as "H4x0r", for example.

Leet symbols, especially the number 1337, are Internet memes that have spilled over into popular culture. Signs that show the numbers "1337" are popular motifs for pictures and are shared widely across the Internet.

Orthography
One of the hallmarks of leet is its unique approach to orthography, using substitutions of other letters, or indeed of characters other than letters, to represent letters in a word. For more casual use of leet, the primary strategy is to use homoglyphs, symbols that closely resemble (to varying degrees) the letters for which they stand. The choice of symbol is not fixed: anything the reader can make sense of is valid. However, this practice is not extensively used in regular leet; more often it is seen in situations where the argot (i.e., secret language) characteristics of the system are required, either to exclude newbies or outsiders in general, i.e., anything that the average reader cannot make sense of is valid; a valid reader should themselves try to make sense, if deserving of the underlying message. Another use for leet orthographic substitutions is the creation of paraphrased passwords. Limitations imposed by websites on password length (usually no more than 36) and the characters permitted (e.g. alphanumeric and symbols) require less extensive forms when used in this application.

Leet is also useful to defeat frequency analysis, should common "a", "e", "o", "s", "t" letters be partially, randomly substituted with "4", "3", "0", "5", "7" digits respectively.

Some examples of leet include:
 B1ff.
 n00b -- a term for "noob", the stereotypical newbie.
 The l33t programming language.
 "E5C4P3": stylized cover of Journey's Escape album.
 The web-comics Megatokyo and Homestuck, which contain characters who speak variations of leet.
 The digit "5" in Deadmau5 nickname.
 Upside-down "1337" (with a bar under "1") also reads as "LEET" (example above).
 "DEF 4L7" plates are used by Defalt, a hacker from the first Watch Dogs videogame.

However, leetspeak should not be confused with SMS-speak, characterized by using "4" as "for", "2" as "to", "gr8 b8 m8, appreci8, no h8" as "great bait, mate, appreciate, no hate", and so on.

Table of leet-speak substitutes for normal letters

Morphology

Text rendered in leet is often characterized by distinctive, recurring forms.
-xor suffix
The meaning of this suffix is parallel with the English -er and -or suffixes (seen in hacker and lesser) in that it derives agent nouns from a verb stem. For example, the first may be seen in the word hax(x)or (H4x0r in leet)  and the second in pwnzor . Additionally, this nominalization may also be inflected with all of the suffixes of regular English verbs. The letter 'o' is often replaced with the numeral 0.
-age suffix
Derivation of a noun from a verb stem is possible by attaching -age to the base form of any verb. Attested derivations are pwnage, skillage,  and speakage. However, leet provides exceptions; the word leetage is acceptable, referring to actively being leet. These nouns are often used with a form of "to be" rather than "to have," e.g., "that was pwnage" rather than "he has pwnage". Either is a more emphatic way of expressing the simpler "he pwns," but the former implies that the person is embodying the trait rather than merely possessing it.
-ness suffix
Derivation of a noun from an adjective stem is done by attaching -ness to any adjective. This is entirely the same as the English form, except it is used much more often in Leet. Nouns such as lulzness and leetness are derivations using this suffix.
Words ending in -ed
When forming a past participle ending in -ed, the Leet user may replace the -e with an apostrophe, as was common in poetry of previous centuries, (e.g. "pwned" becomes "pwn'd"). Sometimes, the apostrophe is removed as well (e.g. "pwned" becomes "pwnd"). The word ending may also be substituted by -t (e.g. pwned becomes pwnt).
Use of the -& suffix
Words ending in -and, -anned, -ant, or a similar sound can sometimes be spelled with an ampersand (&) to express the ending sound (e.g. "This is the s&box", "I'm sorry, you've been b&", "&hill/&farm"). It is most commonly used with the word banned. An alternate form of "B&" is "B7", as the ampersand is with the "7" key on the standard US keyboard.  It is often seen in the abbreviation "IBB7" (in before banned), which indicates that the poster believes that a previous poster will soon be banned from the site, channel, or board on which they are posting.

Grammar

Leet can be pronounced as a single syllable, rhyming with eat, by way of apheresis of the initial vowel of "elite". It may also be pronounced as two syllables, . Like hacker slang, leet enjoys a looser grammar than standard English. The loose grammar, just like loose spelling, encodes some level of emphasis, ironic or otherwise. A reader must rely more on intuitive parsing of leet to determine the meaning of a sentence rather than the actual sentence structure. In particular, speakers of leet are fond of verbing nouns, turning verbs into nouns (and back again) as forms of emphasis, e.g. "Austin rocks" is weaker than "Austin roxxorz" (note spelling), which is weaker than "Au5t1N is t3h r0xx0rz" (note grammar), which is weaker than something like "0MFG D00D /\Ü571N 15 T3H l_l83Я 1337 Я0XX0ЯZ" (OMG, dude, Austin is the über-elite rocks-er!). In essence, all of these mean "Austin rocks," not necessarily the other options. Added words and misspellings add to the speaker's enjoyment. Leet, like hacker slang, employs analogy in construction of new words. For example, if haxored is the past tense of the verb "to hack" (hack → haxor → haxored), then winzored would be easily understood to be the past tense conjugation of "to win," even if the reader had not seen that particular word before.

Leet has its own colloquialisms, many of which originated as jokes based on common typing errors, habits of new computer users, or knowledge of cyberculture and history. Leet is not solely based upon one language or character set. Greek, Russian, and other languages have leet forms, and leet in one language may use characters from another where they are available. As such, while it may be referred to as a "cipher", a "dialect", or a "language", leet does not fit squarely into any of these categories. The term leet itself is often written 31337, or 1337, and many other variations. After the meaning of these became widely familiar, 10100111001 came to be used in its place, because it is the binary form of 1337 decimal, making it more of a puzzle to interpret. An increasingly common characteristic of leet is the changing of grammatical usage so as to be deliberately incorrect. The widespread popularity of deliberate misspelling is similar to the cult following of the "All your base are belong to us" phrase. Indeed, the online and computer communities have been international from their inception, so spellings and phrases typical of non-native speakers are quite common.

Vocabulary

Many words originally derived from leet have now become part of modern Internet slang, such as "pwned". The original driving forces of new vocabulary in leet were common misspellings and typing errors such as "teh" (generally considered lolspeak), and intentional misspellings, especially the "z" at the end of words ("skillz"). Another prominent example of a surviving leet expression is w00t, an exclamation of joy. w00t is sometimes used as a backronym for "We owned the other team."

New words (or corruptions thereof) may arise from a need to make one's username unique. As any given Internet service reaches more people, the number of names available to a given user is drastically reduced. While many users may wish to have the username "CatLover," for example, in many cases it is only possible for one user to have the moniker. As such, degradations of the name may evolve, such as "C@7L0vr." As the leet cipher is highly dynamic, there is a wider possibility for multiple users to share the "same" name, through combinations of spelling and transliterations.

Additionally, leet—the word itself—can be found in the screen-names and gamertags of many Internet and video games. Use of the term in such a manner announces a high level of skill, though such an announcement may be seen as baseless hubris.

Terminology and common misspellings
Warez (nominally ) is a plural shortening of "software", typically referring to cracked and redistributed software. Phreaking refers to the hacking of telephone systems and other non-Internet equipment. Also, from German, is über, which means "over" or "above"; it usually appears as a prefix attached to adjectives, and is frequently written without the umlaut over the u.

Haxor and suxxor (suxorz)
Haxor, and derivations thereof, is leet for "hacker", and it is one of the most commonplace examples of the use of the -xor suffix. Suxxor (pronounced suck-zor) is a derogatory term which originated in warez culture and is currently used in multi-user environments such as multiplayer video games and instant messaging; it, like haxor, is one of the early leet words to use the -xor suffix. Suxxor is a modified version of "sucks" (the phrase "to suck"), and the meaning is the same as the English slang. Suxxor can be mistaken with Succer/Succker if used in the wrong context. Its negative definition essentially makes it the opposite of roxxor, and both can be used as a verb or a noun. The letters ck are often replaced with the Greek Χ (chi) in other words as well.

n00b

Within leet, the term n00b, and derivations thereof, is used extensively. The word means and derives from newbie (as in new and inexperienced or uninformed), and is used as a means of segregating them as less than the "elite," or even "normal," members of a group.

Owned and pwned

Owned and pwned (generally pronounced "poned") both refer to the domination of a player in a video game or argument (rather than just a win), or the successful hacking of a website or computer.  It is a slang term derived from the verb own, meaning to appropriate or to conquer to gain ownership. As is a common characteristic of leet, the terms have also been adapted into noun and adjective forms, ownage and pwnage, which can refer to the situation of pwning or to the superiority of its subject (e.g., "He is a very good player. He is pwnage.").

The term was created accidentally by the misspelling of "own" in video game design due to the keyboard proximity of the "O" and "P" keys. It implies domination or humiliation of a rival, used primarily in the Internet-based video game culture to taunt an opponent who has just been soundly defeated (e.g., "You just got pwned!").  In 2015 Scrabble added pwn to their Official Scrabble Words list.

Pr0n

Pr0n is slang for pornography. This is a deliberately inaccurate spelling/pronunciation for porn, where a zero is often used to replace the letter O. It is sometimes used in legitimate communications (such as email discussion groups, Usenet, chat rooms, and Internet web pages) to circumvent language and content filters, which may reject messages as offensive or spam. The word also helps prevent search engines from associating commercial sites with pornography, which might result in unwelcome traffic. Pr0n is also sometimes spelled backwards (n0rp) to further obscure the meaning to potentially uninformed readers. It can also refer to ASCII art depicting pornographic images, or to photos of the internals of consumer and industrial hardware. Prawn, a spoof of the misspelling, has started to come into use, as well; in Grand Theft Auto: Vice City, a pornographer films his movies on "Prawn Island". Conversely, in the RPG Kingdom of Loathing, prawn, referring to a kind of crustacean, is spelled pr0n, leading to the creation of food items such as "pr0n chow mein".  
Also see porm.

See also 

 Calculator spelling
 Faux Cyrillic
 Martian language, Chinese equivalent
 Gyaru-moji, Japanese equivalent
 Geek Code
 Hexspeak
 Jargon File, a glossary and usage dictionary of computer programmer slang
 SMS language
 LOLCAT
 All your base are belong to us
 Padonkaffsky jargon

Notes

Footnotes

References

Further reading

External links

 
Alphabets
Encodings
In-jokes
Internet culture
Internet memes
Internet slang
Latin-script representations
Nerd culture
Nonstandard spelling
1990s slang